Valerius Maximus  Basilius ( 319–323) was a prominent Roman senator during the reign of the emperor Constantine I.

Life
A pagan, he must have had a successful political career, as he managed to be appointed urban prefect of Rome, serving from 1 September 319 until 13 September 323. He held this post while Constantine was campaigning in the Balkans, and the emperor's son, the Caesar Crispus was at Augusta Treverorum. The abnormally long period of time he held this post, and the extended imperial absence, indicate that he was a trusted imperial subordinate.

Valerius Maximus was either the son of Lucius Valerius Messalla, consul in 280, or (more likely) another descendant of the first's father Lucius Valerius Poplicola Balbinus Maximus, consul in 253, thus paternal nephew of the first.

He was probably the father of Valerius Maximus.

Ancestry

References

	

4th-century Romans
Urban prefects of Rome
Maximus Basilius
Year of birth unknown
Year of death unknown